The Way of the Roses is the newest of Great Britain's coast-to-coast, long-distance cycle routes and is based on minor roads, disused railway lines and specially constructed cycle paths.  It lies entirely within the counties of Lancashire and Yorkshire, crossing the Yorkshire Dales and the Yorkshire Wolds in the north of England, passing through the historic cities of Lancaster and York and scenic towns and villages including Settle, Pateley Bridge and Ripon.

Although a challenge with some hard climbs—the highest point being over —the route is steadily increasing in popularity. The route is fully open and signed.

The route is named after the Wars of the Roses, a 15th-century war between the English dynastic families Lancaster and York.

History 
The route was developed by Sustrans and part of the National Cycle Network (NCN Route 69) in partnership with various Local Authorities, Lancaster City Council, Cyclists Touring Club, Bridlington Renaissance Partnership and Welcome to Yorkshire amongst others.  The route was opened in 2010 running from Morecambe on the west coast of Lancashire to the east coast at Bridlington. A second diversion between Pateley Bridge and York that goes via Harrogate and Knaresborough was opened in 2011. Additionally, there is  a section that links Kingston upon Hull to the cycle route that joins/leaves near Pocklington rather than going to/from Bridlington.

Art 
A number of public artworks have been commissioned for the route.  Matt Baker is currently developing a series of linked artworks at various points along the route.  This work has not yet been completed.

Route 
The route is well signposted with signs carrying the name of the route or marked with the red and white heraldic roses from which the name of the route is derived.

The route starts in the resort town of Morecambe, Lancashire loosely following the River Lune and the River Wenning into the Pennines at Settle and entering the Yorkshire Dales National Park.   From there it makes its steepest climb (eastwards) across the edge of Rye Loaf Hill before descending to Airton.  Thence it heads northeast to Grassington before following the River Wharfe for several miles and then turning towards the high point of the route at Greenhow and descending to Pateley Bridge on the River Nidd.  Beyond Pateley Bridge the hills are significantly lower and after Ripon (with a short exception of the Yorkshire Wolds) the route is more or less flat, passing through York before finally reaching Bridlington and the North Sea. The route is made up primarily of:

minor roads – quiet, country roads (90%)
main roads – mainly short sections through urban areas (5%)
cyclepaths/off road – disused railway lines, etc. (5%)

The Way Of The Roses is best ridden from west to east to take advantage of the prevailing winds from the West and the more favourable gradients.  Tradition dictates that you start the ride by dipping your back wheel in the Irish Sea and only ends when your front wheel gets a dip in the North Sea at the finish. It is typically completed in 3–5 days.

Related NCN Routes 

The Way of the Roses makes use of 8 National Cycle Network routes. Starting in Morecambe on Route 69. It transfers to Route 68 at Clapham  on to Route 688 at Winterburn  and Route 65 at Linton-on-Ouse  Through central York  it follows the short Route 658 before joining Route 66  At Pockington  it takes Route 164 over the Yorkshire Wolds before picking up Route 1 near Hutton Cranswick  which it then uses to the finish in Bridlington.

The route links to other parts of the NCN so can be used as part of a longer cycle tour. In addition to the above listed routes the way of the Roses has junctions with Route 700 at Morecambe  Route 6 at Lancaster  Route 67 near Fountains Abbey  and Route 167 at Huggate in the Yorkshire Wolds

Route maps for The Way of the Roses and detailed route guides from other publishers are available from Sustrans.

References

External links

 Official online guide to the Way of the Roses
Review at the Guardian
 Sustrans. The Way Of The Roses.

Tourist attractions in Lancashire
Tourist attractions in Yorkshire
Cycleways in England
Sustainable transport
2010 establishments in England
Cycling in Yorkshire

nl:Coast to Coast